Antónia Munkácsi (born 26 November 1938) is a Hungarian sprinter. She competed in the women's 200 metres at the 1960 Summer Olympics.

References

External links
 
 

1938 births
Living people
Athletes (track and field) at the 1960 Summer Olympics
Athletes (track and field) at the 1964 Summer Olympics
Athletes (track and field) at the 1968 Summer Olympics
Hungarian female sprinters
Olympic athletes of Hungary
Athletes from Belgrade
Olympic female sprinters